Crossword Bookstores Ltd. is an Indian chain of bookstores in Mumbai. As of today, Crossword has stores in Ahmedabad, Bhopal, Bengaluru, Chennai, Delhi, Gandhinagar, Goa, Hyderabad, Indore, Jaipur, Kochi, Kohima, Kolkata, Kanpur, Kozhikode, Lucknow, Mangalore, Mumbai, Thane, Navi Mumbai, Noida, Kalyan, Nagpur, Nashik, Pune, Raipur, Ranchi, Siliguri, Surat, Thiruvananthapuram, Udaipur, and Vadodara. Crossword also founded and sponsors the Crossword Book Award.

The first bookstore opened on October 15, 1992, in Kemps Corner, Mumbai. In 2005, Crossword became a wholly owned subsidiary of Shopper's Stop Ltd.

Crossword has received wide recognition for its achievement. The Advertising Age magazine named Crossword one of the Marketing Superstars for 1994. The Bookseller has described it as "being on the cutting edge of retailing" in India.

References

External links
 Stores
Parent Company Website

Companies based in Mumbai
Bookstores of India
1992 establishments in Maharashtra
Retail companies established in 1992
Indian companies established in 1992